Ramesh Chand Meena (born 15 January 1963) is an Indian politician and has served as Cabinet Minister of Food and Civil Supplies and Consumer Affairs in Ashok Gehlot ministry and also member of 13th, 14th and 15th Legislative Assembly of Rajasthan. He currently represents Sapotra (Assembly constituency) as a member of Indian National Congress.

Early life and education
Mr. Ramesh Meena was born 15 January 1963 in the Nayagaon village in Mandrayal tehsil of Karauli district of Rajasthan to his father Shankar Lal Meena. In 1995, he married Smt Kamlesh Meena. In 1993, he attended University of Rajasthan and attained Bachelor of Engineering (Civil)  degree. He is a contractor by profession.

Political career
Mr. Ramesh Meena has been MLA three times. He started his political career in 1993 elections as an Independent candidate but lost and stood third with 18,071 (25.21℅) votes. And again contested in 1998 elections, but again he lost and stood fourth with 7,504 (9.74℅) votes. After two time failure he was finally elected MLA in 2008 Rajasthan Legislative Assembly election from Sapotra (Assembly constituency) as a member of Bahujan Samaj Party, he defeated Indian National Congress candidate Mukhraj by a margin of 8,329 (7.18℅) votes. He has given open support to INC government and joined Indian National Congress in 2013.

In 14th Legislative Assembly of Rajasthan (2013) elections, he was again elected MLA as a member of Indian National Congress, he defeated Bharatiya Janata Party candidate Rishikesh by a margin of 6,232 (4.36℅) votes.

In 15th Legislative Assembly of Rajasthan (2018) elections, he was elected for a third time continuously Member of Legislative Assembly of Sapotra by defeating Bharatiya Janta Party candidate Golma Devi Meena by a margin of 14,104 (8.26℅) votes.

In December 2018, he was appointed Cabinet Minister in third Ashok Gehlot ministry with portfolios of Food and Civil Supplies and Consumer Affairs.

Posts held

References

Indian National Congress politicians
1963 births
Living people
Rajasthani politicians
People from Karauli district
Rajasthan MLAs 2018–2023
Indian National Congress politicians from Rajasthan